MAC HKB Újbuda is a Hungarian ice hockey team that currently plays in the Erste Liga. They play their home games at Tüskecsarnok, located in Budapest. In their first year of competition they would finish second in the regular season, and would reach the league finals, being swept in 4 games by DVTK Jegesmedvék. In their second season MAC would once again finish the regular season in 2nd place. They won their first playoff series 4-1 over Fehérvári Titanok, as well as their second over Debreceni HK in the semi-final 4-1. In the final they would be swept four games to one by the defending champions DVTK Jegesmedvék to once again finish in second place overall. In 2018 team began new era with joining slovak Tipsport liga.

Arena
MAC HKB Újbuda plays out of the newly renovated Tüskecsarnok on the 'Buda' side of Budapest. It is the home of the Hungarian national team as well as KMH Budapest playing in the Slovak 2. Liga.

Current roster
Current roster (as of November 12, 2018):

References

External links
 Official Club Website

Ice hockey teams in Hungary
Erste Liga (ice hockey) teams